Ł̣ (minuscule: ł̣) is a letter of the Latin alphabet, derived from Ł with a diacritical dot below. It is or was used in some languages to represent various sounds.

In Iñupiaq, a Canadian Eskimo–Aleut language, it is used to represent the voiceless palatal lateral fricative. It is the eleventh letter of the alphabet and is sorted between ł and m.

Latin letters with diacritics
Letters with dot